{{DISPLAYTITLE:C6H12}}
The molecular formula C6H12 may refer to following structural isomers:

Acyclic Compounds 
Hexenes
1-Hexene
2-Hexene
3-Hexene
Methylpentenes
2-Methyl-1-pentene
3-Methyl-1-pentene
4-Methyl-1-pentene
2-Methyl-2-pentene
3-Methyl-2-pentene
4-Methyl-2-pentene
Dimethylbutenes
2,3-Dimethyl-1-butene
3,3-Dimethyl-1-butene
2,3-Dimethyl-2-butene
2-Ethyl-1-butene

Cyclic compounds 

 Cyclohexane
 Methylcyclopentane
 Ethylcyclobutane
Dimethylcyclobutanes
1,1-Dimethylcyclobutane
1,2-Dimethylcyclobutane
1,3-Dimethylcyclobutane
Trimethylcyclopropanes
1,1,2-Trimethylcyclopropane
1,2,3-Trimethylcyclopropane
Ethylmethylcyclopropanes
1-Ethyl-1-methylcyclopropane
1-Ethyl-2-methylcyclopropane
Isopropylcyclopropane
Propylcyclopropane

Note:  cis-trans isomers and enantiomers are not included in this list. .---.